The Évian Conference was convened 6–15 July 1938 at Évian-les-Bains, France, to address the problem of German and Austrian Jewish refugees wishing to flee persecution by Nazi Germany. It was the initiative of United States President Franklin D. Roosevelt who perhaps hoped to obtain commitments from some of the invited nations to accept more refugees, although he took pains to avoid stating that objective expressly. Historians have suggested that Roosevelt desired to deflect attention and criticism from American policy that severely limited the quota of refugees admitted to the United States.

The conference was attended by representatives from 32 countries, and 24 voluntary organizations also attended as observers, presenting plans either orally or in writing. Golda Meir, the attendee from British Mandate Palestine, was not permitted to speak or to participate in the proceedings except as an observer. Some 200 international journalists gathered at Évian to observe and report on the meeting. The Soviet Union refused to take part in the conference, though direct talks on resettlement of Jews and Slavs between German and Soviet governments proceeded at the time of the conference and after it. In the end, the Soviet Union refused to accept refugees and a year later ordered its border guards to treat all refugees attempting to cross into Soviet territory as spies.

The conference was ultimately doomed, as aside from the Dominican Republic, delegations from the 32 participating nations failed to come to any agreement about accepting the Jewish refugees fleeing the Third Reich. The conference thus inadvertently proved to be a useful propaganda tool for the Nazis. Adolf Hitler responded to the news of the conference by saying that if other nations agreed to take the Jews, he would help them leave.

Background

The Nuremberg Laws stripped German Jews, who were already persecuted by the Hitler regime, of their German citizenship. They were classified as "subjects" and became stateless in their own country. By 1938, some 450,000 of about 900,000 German Jews were expelled or fled Germany, mostly to France and British Mandate Palestine, where the large wave of migrants led to an Arab uprising. When Hitler annexed Austria in March 1938, and applied German racial laws, the 200,000 Jews of Austria became stateless.

Hitler's expansion was accompanied by a rise in antisemitism and fascism across Europe and the Middle East. Antisemitic governments came to power in Hungary and Romania, where Jews had always been second-class citizens. The result was millions of Jews attempting to flee Europe, while they were perceived as an undesirable and socially damaging population with popular academic theories arguing that Jews damaged the "racial hygiene" or "eugenics" of nations where they were resident and engaged in conspirative behaviour.  In 1936, Chaim Weizmann (who decided not to attend the conference) declared that "the world seemed to be divided into two parts – those places where the Jews could not live and those where they could not enter."

Before the Conference the United States and Britain made a critical agreement: the British promised not to bring up the fact that the United States was not filling its immigration quotas, and any mention of Palestine as a possible destination for Jewish refugees was excluded from the agenda. Britain administered Palestine under the terms of the Mandate for Palestine.

Proceedings
Conference delegates expressed sympathy for Jews under Nazism but made no immediate joint resolution or commitment, portraying the conference as a mere beginning, to the frustration of some commentators. Noting "that the involuntary emigration of people in large numbers has become so great that it renders racial and religious problems more acute, increases international unrest, and may hinder seriously the processes of appeasement in international relations", the Évian Conference established the Intergovernmental Committee on Refugees (ICR) with the purpose to "approach the governments of the countries of refuge with a view to developing opportunities for permanent settlement." The ICR received little authority or support from its member nations and fell into inaction.

The United States sent no government official to the conference. Instead Roosevelt's friend, the American businessman Myron C. Taylor, represented the U.S. with James G. McDonald as his advisor. The U.S. agreed that the German and Austrian immigration quota of 30,000 a year would be made available to Jewish refugees. In the three years 1938 to 1940 the US actually exceeded this quota by 10,000. During the same period Britain accepted almost the same number of German Jews. Australia agreed to take 15,000 over three years, with South Africa taking only those with close relatives already resident; Canada refused to make any commitment and only accepted a few refugees over this period. The Australian delegate T. W. White noted: "as we have no real racial problem, we are not desirous of importing one". The French delegate stated that France had reached "the extreme point of saturation as regards admission of refugees", a sentiment repeated by most other representatives. The only countries willing to accept a large number of Jews were the Dominican Republic, which offered to accept up to 100,000 refugees on generous terms, and later Costa Rica. In 1940 an agreement was signed and Rafael Trujillo donated  of his properties near the town of Sosúa for settlements. The first settlers arrived in May 1940: only about 800 settlers came to Sosúa, and most later moved on to the United States.

Disagreements among the numerous Jewish organisations on how to handle the refugee crisis added to the confusion.  Concerned that Jewish organisations would be seen trying to promote greater immigration into the United States, executive secretary to the American Jewish Committee, Morris Waldman, privately warned against Jewish representatives highlighting the problems Jewish refugees faced. Samuel Rosenman sent President Franklin D. Roosevelt a memorandum stating that an "increase of quotas is wholly inadvisable as it would merely produce a 'Jewish problem' in the countries increasing the quota." According to the JTA, during the discussions, five leading Jewish organisations sent a joint memorandum discouraging mass Jewish emigration from central Europe.  Reacting to the conferences' failure, the AJC declined to directly criticise American policy, while Jonah Wise blamed the British government and praised "American generosity". Zionist leaders Chaim Weizmann and David Ben-Gurion of the Jewish Agency were both firmly opposed to Jews being allowed entry into Western countries, hoping that the pressure of hundreds of thousands of refugees having nowhere to go would force Britain to open Palestine to Jewish immigration. In a similar vein, Abba Hillel Silver of the United Jewish Appeal refused to assist the resettlement of Jews in the United States saying he saw "no particular good" in what the conference was trying to achieve. The guiding principle of Zionist leaders was to press only for immigration to Palestine. Yoav Gelber concluded that “if the conference were to lead to a mass emigration to places other than Palestine, the Zionist leaders were not particularly interested in its work.”  Years later, while noting that American and British Jewish leaders were "very helpful to our work behind the scenes, [but] were not notably enthusiastic about it in public", Edward Turnour who led the British delegation recalled the "stubbornly unrealistic approach" of some leading Zionists who insisted on Palestine as the only option for the refugees.

Consequences

The result of the failure of the conference was that many of the Jews had no escape and so were ultimately subject to what was known as Hitler's "Final Solution to the Jewish Question". Two months after Évian, in September 1938, Britain and France granted Hitler the right to occupy the Sudetenland of Czechoslovakia. In November 1938, on Kristallnacht, a massive pogrom across the Third Reich was accompanied by the destruction of over 1,000 synagogues, massacres and the mass arrests of tens of thousands of Jews. In March 1939, Hitler occupied more of Czechoslovakia, causing a further 180,000 Jews to fall under Axis control, while in May 1939 the British issued the White Paper which barred Jews from entering Palestine or buying land there. Following their occupation of Poland in late 1939 and invasion of Soviet Union in 1941, the Germans embarked on a program of systematically killing all Jews in Europe.

Reaction
German Führer Adolf Hitler said in response to the conference:

In her autobiography My Life (1975), Golda Meir described her outrage being in "the ludicrous capacity of the [Jewish] observer from Palestine, not even seated with the delegates, although the refugees under discussion were my own people..." After the conference Meir told the press: "There is only one thing I hope to see before I die and that is that my people should not need expressions of sympathy anymore."

In July 1979, Walter Mondale described the hope represented by the Evian conference:"At stake at Evian were both human lives – and the decency and self-respect of the civilized world. If each nation at Evian had agreed on that day to take in 17,000 Jews at once, every Jew in the Reich could have been saved. As one American observer wrote, 'It is heartbreaking to think of the ... desperate human beings ... waiting in suspense for what happens at Evian. But the question they underline is not simply humanitarian ... it is a test of civilization.'"

Participants

National delegations

Other delegations

Private organizations
 Agudas Israel World Organization, London
 Alliance Israélite Universelle, Paris
 American, British, Belgian, French, Dutch, and Swiss Catholic Committees for Aid to Refugees
 American Joint Distribution Committee, Paris
 Association de colonisation juive, Paris
 Association of German Scholars in Distress Abroad, London
 Bureau international pour le respect du droit d'asyle et l'aide aux réfugiés politiques, Paris
 Central Bureau for the Settlement of German Jews, London
 Central Committee for Refugees from Germany, Prague
 Centre de recherches de solutions au problème juif, Paris
 Comité d'aide et d'assistance aux victimes de l'anti-semitisme en Allemagne, Brussels
 Comite for Bijzondere Joodsche Belangen, Amsterdam
 Comité international pour le placement des intellectuels réfugiés, Geneva
 Comité pour la défense des droits des Israélites en Europe centrale et orientale, Paris
 Committee of Aid for German Jews, London
 Council for German Jewry, London
 Emigration Advisory Committee, London
 Fédération des émigrés d'Autriche, Paris
 Fédération internationale des émigrés d'Allemagne, Paris
 Freeland Association, London
 German Committee of the Quaker Society of Friends, London
 HICEM, Paris
 International Christian Committee for Non-Aryans, London
 Internationale ouvrière et socialiste, Paris and Brussels
 Jewish Agency for Palestine, London
 The Joint Foreign Committee of the Board of Deputies of British Jews and the Anglo-Jewish Association, London
 Komitee für die Entwicklung der grossen jüdischen Kolonisation, Zürich
 League of Nations Union, London
 New Zionist Organization, London
 ORT, Paris
 Royal Institute of International Affairs, London
 Schweizer Hilfszentrum für Flüchtlinge, Basel
 Service international de migration, Geneva
 Service universitaire international, Geneva
 Société d'émigration et de colonisation juive Emcol, Paris
 Society for the Protection of Sciences and Studies, London
 Union des Sociétés OSE, Paris
 World Jewish Congress, Paris

Press
The international press was represented by about two hundred journalists, chiefly the League of Nations correspondents of the leading daily and weekly newspapers and news agencies.

See also 
 Bermuda Conference
 British Mandate of Palestine
 Kimberley Plan
 Kristallnacht (November 9, 1938)
 White Paper of 1939
 SS Navemar
 SS St. Louis
 The Holocaust
 International response to the Holocaust

References

Further reading
 Adler-Rudel, S. “The Evian Conference on the Refugee Question.” Year Book XIII of the Leo Baeck Institute (London: 1968): 235–273.
 Afoumado, Diane. Indésirables: 1938 : La conférence d’Evian et les réfugiés juifs (Calmann-Lévy / Mémorial de la Shoah, 2018).
 Bartrop, Paul R. The Evian Conference of 1938 and the Jewish Refugee Crisis (Springer International Publishing, 2018).
 Bartrop, Paul R. The Holocaust and Australia: Refugees, Rejection, and Memory (Bloomsbury Publishing, 2022).
 Breitman, Richard, and Allan J. Lichtman.  “ 'Moving Millions?' in FDR and the Jews (Harvard University Press, 2013), pp. 98–124. online
 Brustein, William I., and Ryan D. King. "Anti-semitism in Europe before the Holocaust." International Political Science Review 25.1 (2004): 35–53. online
 Estorick, Eric. "The Evian Conference and the Intergovernmental Committee." The Annals of the American Academy of Political and Social Science 203.1 (1939): 136–141. online
 Harris, Bonnie M. “FDR, Evian, and the Refugee Crisis.” in Philippine Sanctuary: A Holocaust Odyssey (University of Wisconsin Press, 2020), pp. 42–68. online
 Katz, Shlomo Z. “Public Opinion in Western Europe and the Evian Conference of July 1938.” Yad Vashem Studies 9 (1973): 105–132.
 Laffer, Dennis R. "The Jewish Trail of Tears The Evian Conference of 1938" (Thesis, University of South Florida, 2011) online.
 Medoff, Rafael. The Jews Should Keep Quiet: Franklin D. Roosevelt, Rabbi Stephen S. Wise, and the Holocaust (U of Nebraska Press, 2021).
 Medoff, Rafael. America and the Holocaust: A Documentary History (University of Nebraska Press, 2022) online
 Mendelsohn, John, ed. Jewish Emigration from 1933 to the Evian Conference of 1938 (Taylor & Francis, 1982).
 Schreiber, Mordecai. Explaining the Holocaust: How and Why It Happened (The Lutterworth Press, 2015) online

External links
 Decisions Taken at the Évian Conference
 The Évian Conference on the Yad Vashem website
 Former english daily Palestine Posts contemporary news
 Sosúa Virtual Museum    Living memorial to the Sosúa settlers

Jewish emigration from Nazi Germany
International response to the Holocaust
Diplomatic conferences in France
International conferences in France
20th-century diplomatic conferences
1938 conferences
1938 in international relations
1938 in France
The Holocaust and the United States
July 1938 events